Myer Siegel was a Los Angeles-based department store, founded by Myer Siegel (1866–1934), specializing in women's clothing.

Myer Siegel established his store in 1886 at 218 N. Spring St., at that time selling only children's wear and lingerie.

On April 7, 1896, Siegel married Flora Magnin, daughter of I. Magnin, the San Francisco fine clothing maker and retailer.

In 1897 and 1898, I. Magnin & Co., manufacturers, advertised its wares for sale at 237 S. Spring St., noting Myer Siegel as the manager.

The I. Magnin store that Siegel managed moved to the Irvine Byrne Building at 251 S. Broadway on January 2, 1899; on June 19, 1904, I. Magnin announced that the Los Angeles store would henceforth be known as "Myer Siegel".

After a fire at the Irvine Byrne Building destroyed its store on February 16, 1911, Myer Siegel moved to the former quarters of the Brockton Shoe store at 455 S. Broadway, now a Fallas Paredes department store.

In the early 1920s, Myer Siegel moved again, to part of the former Central Department Store building, at 617-9 S. Broadway. 

In 1927 it moved to 733 S. Flower Street, near 7th Street, south and west of the Broadway retail district, after upscale J. W. Robinson's opened up its giant  (eventually ) flagship along 7th between Hope and Grand in 1915, and as more upscale shops such as Desmond's and Coulter's were also moving to the district.

By 1934, the company moved to 7th and Olive, the former quarters of retailer B. H. Dyas and Co. By that time the company had, in addition to its downtown flagship, branches in Pasadena, Hollywood and on Wilshire Boulevard in Miracle Mile.

Its Miracle Mile store at what is now known as the Dominguez-Wilshire Building, is considered a landmark by the Los Angeles Conservancy and was renovated in 2000. At 5410 Wilshire Boulevard, it had many elements that were innovative at the time: air-cooled fitting rooms, aluminum furniture, exotic woods, metalwork and terrazzo floors. It was financed by and named for the Dominguez family, who received one of the original Spanish land grants in 1784.

Later in December 1937, a branch opened at 1025 Westwood Boulevard in Westwood, Los Angeles designed by Allen Siple. The University of California photo archives notes: "The large glass brick panel above the marquee allowed light to enter the mezzanine, and marble wainscoting flanked the entrance which was paved in travertine. This building is still standing."

References

Defunct department stores based in Greater Los Angeles